Audrey A. McNiff  is the former Managing Director and co-head of Currency Sales at Goldman Sachs.

McNiff was raised in Massachusetts attending Lawrence Academy.  She received her B.A. in economics from Mount Holyoke College in 1980 and her M.B.A. from New York University in 1989.  She is currently on the Board of Trustees at Lawrence Academy and Mount Holyoke (2002-2012) where she serves as Chairwoman of their Investment Committee. She is also a board member of the Fidelity Gift Fund and the John A Hartford Foundation. She retired as a Partner from Goldman Sachs in 2008.
/Users/audreymcniff/Desktop/Audrey with Mitt Romney.jpg

References

American financial businesspeople
Mount Holyoke College alumni
Year of birth missing (living people)
Living people